The Return of Frank James is a 1940 Western film directed by Fritz Lang and starring Henry Fonda and Gene Tierney. It is a sequel to Henry King's 1939 film Jesse James. Written by Sam Hellman, the film loosely follows the life of Frank James following the death of his outlaw brother, Jesse James, at the hands of the Ford brothers. The film is universally considered historically inaccurate, but was a commercial success. It was the first motion picture for the actress Gene Tierney, who plays a reporter for the newspaper The Denver Star.

Premise
After the death of his outlaw brother, Jesse (played in the earlier film by Tyrone Power), Frank James (Henry Fonda) seeks revenge on his killers, Bob and Charlie Ford (John Carradine and Charles Tannen).

Cast
Henry Fonda as Frank James
Gene Tierney as Eleanor Stone
Jackie Cooper as Clem
Henry Hull as Major Rufus Cobb
John Carradine as Bob Ford
J. Edward Bromberg as George Runyan
Donald Meek as McCoy 
Eddie Collins as Station Agent
George Barbier as Judge 
Russell Hicks as Prosecutor 
Ernest Whitman as Pinky 
Charles Tannen as Charlie Ford
Lloyd Corrigan as Randolph Stone 
Victor Kilian as Preacher 
Edward McWade as Colonel Jackson
George Chandler as Roy
Irving Bacon as Bystander
Frank Shannon as Sheriff
Barbara Pepper as Nellie Blane
Louie Mason as Watchman, Wilson
Stymie Beard as Mose
William Pawley and Frank Sully as Actors
Davidson Clark as Officer
Robert McKenzie as Old Man on Rocker (uncredited)
Adrian Morris as Denver Detective (uncredited)
Lillian Yarbo as Eleanor's Maid (uncredited)

Production

The railroad scenes were filmed on the Sierra Railroad in Tuolumne County, California.

Preservation
The Academy Film Archive preserved The Return of Frank James in 2000.

References

External links
 
 
 
 

1940 films
1940 Western (genre) films
20th Century Fox films
American Western (genre) films
American biographical films
American films about revenge
American sequel films
Biographical films about people of the American Old West
Films directed by Fritz Lang
Films produced by Darryl F. Zanuck
Films scored by David Buttolph
James–Younger Gang
1940s English-language films
1940s American films